Downhill Strand (better known as Benone Strand) is a beach in County Londonderry, Northern Ireland.

It is located next to the A2 road, and the Derry to Coleraine section of the Belfast–Derry railway line. Mussenden Temple and the village of Downhill are located at the eastern end of Benone Strand.

References

Beaches of Northern Ireland
Landforms of County Londonderry
Tourist attractions in County Londonderry